United Torah Judaism (Yahadut HaTora), often referred to by its electoral symbol Gimel, is a Haredi, religious conservative political alliance in Israel. The alliance, consisting of Agudat Yisrael and Degel HaTorah, was first formed in 1992, in order to maximize Ashkenazi Haredi representation in the Knesset. Despite the alliance splitting in 2004 over rabbinical differences, the parties reconciled in 2006, in order to prevent vote-wasting. In April 2019, the party achieved its highest number of seats ever, receiving eight seats.

Unlike similar religiously-oriented parties like Shas, The Jewish Home, Tkuma, and Noam, UTJ is non-Zionist. Unlike some other Haredim, the party is notable for its usage of technology and electronic communication.

History 

Before the establishment of Degel HaTorah and the formation of United Torah Judaism, the two factions were united under one united Agudat Yisrael party, but the late mentor and supreme guide of the non-Hasidic group, Rabbi Elazar Shach, broke away from the Hasidic wing when he concluded that the party was not representing all Ashkenazi Haredim. At that point, he split from them, and created the Degel HaTorah party for the "Lithuanian" Haredi Jews (also known as "Mitnagdim" by some). He chose the name Degel HaTorah, meaning "Flag of The Torah", to be a contrast to the well-known flag of Israel and its connection with the secular-dominated State of Israel (an "anti-Torah" entity, in his opinion). Rabbi Shach was known as an outspoken critic of the secular Israeli way of life.

The UTJ party also had considerable influence on the Israeli Sephardi Jews' Shas party. In fact, the Shas party was founded by Rabbi Shach at an earlier juncture when he was previously also frustrated with the policies of the Hasidic rebbes; so, he turned to the Sephardic Jews, and urged his own Ashkenazi followers at that time, to vote for the new Shas party, which they did in record numbers. Later, Shas broke with Rabbi Shach, as it adopted its own independent political stance under Rabbi Ovadia Yosef. Yet, Shas generally goes in the same direction, as it has similar values, needs and interests within the state.

Haaretz cited that some women activists have protested the fact that UTJ, along with other Haredi parties, refuses to run female candidates for office. UTJ responded that they have the right to follow the Jewish laws of modesty, which separates roles of men and women, and maintain that they do not deny women the right to vote for any other Knesset parties of their choice. They add that Haredi women will not vote for them if they elect women.

2004 split 
In January 2004, the party split back into its two factions following a disagreement over how to join Ariel Sharon's coalition, which had been negotiated by Rabbi Yosef Shalom Eliashiv. Rabbi Eliashiv wanted the five MKs to have a three-month "waiting period" before accepting jobs in the government. Rabbi Yaakov Aryeh Alter, the Gerrer rebbe, however, thought that all Agudat members should accept positions immediately. The Agudat MKs argued that they should be entitled to follow their own rabbis' ruling, while their Degel HaTorah counterparts accused them of disrespecting Rabbi Eliashiv. The Agudat faction proceeded to follow the rebbe of Ger's instructions, with MK Yaakov Litzman accepting the position as chairman of the Knesset Finance Committee. This infuriated Degel HaTorah and its leaders, and in response, they left the party, dissolving a twelve-year-old partnership.

Re-unification as a party 
In December 2005, there was a meeting between representatives of the two factions, presumably to smooth over the ill-feelings of the previous year and to attempt to re-group before the March 2006 elections. A number of issues were worked out, such as Degel HaTorah's insistence on the joint list being equally divided between the two parties. (In the past, Agudat Israel has received slightly more votes than Degel HaTorah.) Degel HaTorah has re-organized itself. It has a fully equipped modern party office on Hamabit Street 10 in Jerusalem's Geula neighborhood. It conducted a party convention, its first in 15 years, in December 2005.

In early February 2006, Agudat Israel and Degel HaTorah agreed to run together as United Torah Judaism, despite the fact that the contentious "sixth seat" issue remained undecided. The two groups finally compromised by proposing dividing the sixth seat between two representatives on a rotating schedule (as was done in the last Knesset between the Belz and Vizhnitz communities for the fifth seat). This solution seemed to mollify the respective groups, and paved the way for the re-establishment of a joint list for the 2006 elections, although the Belz court was reportedly irked that once again, it was being asked to sacrifice part of its representation.

UTJ MKs told reporters that any decision to join future government coalitions will be dependent on achieving two "central posts" to be split between Agudah and Degel. Similarly, in order to avoid the problems that led to the 2004 split, disagreements about joining a coalition will not be determined by a majority vote of MKs, but rather taken to the party's rabbinic leaders.

Various media interviews with the party's Knesset members confirmed that it would strongly consider joining a coalition with the Ehud Olmert-led Kadima party, should it be offered to them after the elections. In March 2006, the rabbinical leaders of UTJ, including Rabbi Yosef Shalom Eliashiv, issued public declarations urging the Haredi public to vote for the party's list. In the election, the party increased its mandate by one, to six seats.

Ideology 
United Torah Judaism (Yahadut HaTorah – UTJ) is a coalition of two Haredi parties, Agudat Israel and Degel HaTorah, which submitted a joint list in the 1992 election, in which it won four Knesset seats. In the 1999 elections, UTJ won five Knesset seats. UTJ wants to maintain a status quo relationship in regard to religion-and-state issues. The party has no uniform opinion on the issue of increasing settlements in the West Bank.

Structure and constituency 
UTJ has always been a coalition of two individual parties, choosing to take advantage of Israeli election law in order to maximize the number of seats it can gain in the Knesset (and thus maximize its influence):
 The Agudat Yisrael ("Union of Israel") party that is guided by the followers of Hasidism in Israel, and also consisting of Ashkenazi Jews. The leading members of this party are the followers of the Ger, Vizhnitz, and Belz Hasidim.
 The Degel HaTorah ("Banner of the Torah") party that is guided by the rabbinic heads (usually the leading rosh yeshivas ("deans") of the Lithuanian yeshivas) of non-Hasidic Haredi Ashkenazi Jews.

The Agudat Yisrael faction takes its directions from the Hasidic rebbes of Ger (Rabbi Yaakov Aryeh Alter), Vizhnitz (Rabbi Yisroel Hager), and Belz (Rabbi Yissachar Dov Rokeach). Policy decisions are also weighed and decided by a Moetzes Gedolei HaTorah ("Council of Torah Sages"), a council of communal rabbis, made up of mostly senior and elderly rebbes.

Degel HaTorah's pre-eminent sages are Rabbi Chaim Kanievsky and Rabbi Gershon Edelstein, of Bnei Brak. Policy decisions are also weighed and decided by their own "Moetzes" (Council) of experienced communal rabbis, made up of mostly senior and elderly rosh yeshivas.

Election results

Knesset members

See also 
 Agudath Israel of America
 Hasidim and Mitnagdim
 World Agudath Israel
 Chardal

References

External links 

 United Torah Judaism Knesset website

Ashkenazi Jews topics
Haredi Judaism in Israel
Orthodox Jewish political parties
Political party alliances in Israel
Political parties established in 1992
1992 establishments in Israel
Conservative parties in Israel
Social conservative parties
Right-wing parties
Right-wing politics in Israel